Paropsisterna bimaculata is a beetle commonly called a leaf beetle in the subfamily Chrysomelinae.This insect is common in Tasmania and can be a pest in the forestry industry. Paropsisterna bimaculata will develop a red color just before their winter hibernation. When they emerge the red slowly disappears into a pale green colouring with faint gold tessellation. This takes about a month with the males generally slightly advanced. Recently this beetle has been noticed in Victoria.

References

Beetles of Australia
Chrysomelinae
Taxa named by Guillaume-Antoine Olivier
Beetles described in 1807